James McWillie Franklin FRSC (born 1942) is a Canadian geologist who helped build and advance the knowledge base of Canada's minerals industry.

He was educated at Carleton University (BSc, 1964; MSc, 1967) and the University of Western Ontario (PhD, 1970).

He was awarded the Selwyn G. Blaylock Medal of the Canadian Institute of Mining, Metallurgy and Petroleum in 2006, the Logan Medal of the Geological Association of Canada in 2008, and the Penrose Gold Medal of the Society of Economic Geologists in 2014. He is a 2019 inductee of the Canadian Mining Hall of Fame.

References

1942 births
Living people
Carleton University alumni
University of Western Ontario alumni
Fellows of the Royal Society of Canada
Canadian geologists